Toni Edgar-Bruce (4 June 1892 – 28 March 1966) was a British actress, frequently seen on stage. Her theatre work included the original West End production of Somerset Maugham's The Circle in 1921.

The actor-manager Edgar Bruce was her father.

Filmography

 Duke's Son (1920)
 Charles Augustus Milverton (1922)
 A Warm Corner (1930)
 Tell England (1931)
 Brother Alfred (1932)
 Mr. Bill the Conqueror (1932)
 Diamond Cut Diamond (1932)
 Lucky Girl (1932)
 The Melody-Maker (1933)
 Falling for You (1933)
 Mannequin (1933)
 As Good As New (1933)
 Heads We Go (1933)
 Letting in the Sunshine (1933)
 Leave It to Me (1933)
 Princess Charming (1934)
 The Broken Melody (1934)
 Nell Gwynn (1934)
 Lilies of the Field (1934)
 Whispering Tongues (1934)
 Handle with Care (1935)
 Mr. What's-His-Name? (1935)
 Night Mail (1935)
 Captain Bill (1936)
 The Last Waltz (1936)
 Boys Will Be Girls (1937)
 Behind Your Back (1937)
 Scruffy (1938)
 Too Dangerous to Live (1939)
 Gert and Daisy Clean Up (1942)
 The First of the Few (1942)
 Somewhere on Leave (1943)
 It Happened One Sunday (1944)
 Heaven Is Round the Corner (1944)
 Twilight Hour (1945)
 Waltz Time (1945)
 Derby Day (1952)

References

External links
 

1892 births
1966 deaths
English stage actresses
English film actresses
English silent film actresses
Actresses from London
20th-century English actresses